Samuel Roy McKelvie (April 15, 1881 – January 6, 1956) was an American politician from the U.S. state of Nebraska. McKelvie served as the 19th governor of Nebraska, from 1919 to 1923. He was also the 13th lieutenant governor of Nebraska, from 1913 to 1915.

McKelvie was born near Fairfield, Nebraska. He attended the University of Nebraska and graduated from Lincoln Business College in 1901. He married Martha (Flossie) DeArnold on June 19, 1904, and the couple had two children. As Martha McKelvie, his spouse was a noted silent movie columnist, and, starting three years after his death, the author of what became a total of twenty-four books, one of them, Presidents, Politicians and People I Have Known, a memoir.

Career
From 1902 to 1905, McKelvie sold advertising for the Twentieth Century Farmer of Omaha, Nebraska. The editor of Nebraska Farmer beginning in 1905, he became principal owner and publisher of that paper by 1908.

McKelvie first entered politics as a member of the Lincoln City Council. He held that position from 1908 to 1909. McKelvie was then elected to one term in the Nebraska House of Representatives in 1910, and served as the Lieutenant Governor of Nebraska from 1913 to 1915.

McKelvie was the Republican gubernatorial nominee in 1918, and defeated Democratic incumbent Keith Neville. Reelected in 1920, he saw a state park system initiated, construction plans for a new state capitol building approved, the state accounting system restructured, and forty-one new amendments to the state constitution sanctioned during his tenure. On April 15, 1922, a few months before leaving the governorship, McKelvie helped break ground for the current Nebraska State Capitol.

After stepping down from the governorship, McKelvie returned to his publishing position at Nebraska Farmer. He was a delegate to the Republican National Convention in 1936 and 1944.

Death and legacy
McKelvie died on January 6, 1956, at his winter home near Mesa, Arizona after suffering two heart attacks.  He is interred at Wyuka Cemetery in Lincoln, Nebraska.

The Samuel R. McKelvie National Forest is named after him.

References

External links
 
 

1881 births
1956 deaths
People from Clay County, Nebraska
University of Nebraska alumni
Writers from Nebraska
Republican Party members of the Nebraska House of Representatives
Republican Party governors of Nebraska
Lieutenant Governors of Nebraska
20th-century American politicians